The National Registration Act 1915 was an Act of Parliament in the United Kingdom.

The Act provided for the establishment of a register of every civilian in the country between the ages of 15 and 65. The objective was to deal with the labour crisis that arose because so many volunteers had joined the Forces that essential industries were left without key workers. The register was further intended to assist in efficient deployment of labour as the government imposed more controls on the workforce, and the forms listed any alternative trades for each individual, whether current or not. The register was also used when conscription was introduced in 1916.

Bernard Mallet, the Registrar General for England, set up a system whereby on registration day, 15 August 1915, everyone was to fill in a form showing personal details, nature of employment, and any other work which they were skilled and able and willing to do. The forms were organised by each local authority. However the Registrar General for Scotland devised a separate system whereby all forms were held centrally in Edinburgh.

After the war, all the records were destroyed.

See also
Timeline of the United Kingdom home front during the First World War
National Registration Act 1939

References

External links

Emergency laws in the United Kingdom
1915 in law
United Kingdom Acts of Parliament 1915
United Kingdom in World War I